The white-gorgeted flycatcher (Anthipes monileger) is a species of passerine bird in the Old World flycatcher family. It is native to Bangladesh, Bhutan, China, India, Laos, Myanmar, Nepal, Thailand and Vietnam. Its natural habitat is subtropical or tropical moist montane forests. It was formerly placed in the genus Ficedula.

References

External links 
 BirdLife International (2010) Species factsheet: Ficedula monileger

white-gorgeted flycatcher
Birds of Bhutan
Birds of Nepal
Birds of Northeast India
Birds of Southeast Asia
white-gorgeted flycatcher
Taxonomy articles created by Polbot